Brachodes fulgurita is a moth of the family Brachodidae. It is found in Russia.

References

Moths described in 1832
Brachodidae